Travelers Hotel is a historic hotel located at Kirksville, Adair County, Missouri. It was built in 1923–1924, and is a four-story, brick building that consists of two wings flanking a central core.  It has commercial storefronts on the first floor and features a centrally placed flat roof porch with Doric order piers and a wide metal cornice.

It was listed on the National Register of Historic Places in 2009.

References

Hotel buildings on the National Register of Historic Places in Missouri
Hotel buildings completed in 1924
Buildings and structures in Adair County, Missouri
National Register of Historic Places in Adair County, Missouri